Altay-Göztepe derby is the name given to football matches between Göztepe and Altay, both of them from İzmir, Turkey.

Honours

Matches (Post 1959)

References 

Turkey football rivalries
Altay S.K.
Göztepe S.K.